The Water may refer to:

 The Water (Middle-earth), a river in J. R. R. Tolkien's legendarium
 The Water (Colin MacIntyre album), a 2008 album by Colin McIntyre
 The Water (San Cisco album), a 2017 album by San Cisco
 "The Water" (Feist song), a song by Canadian singer Feist
 "The Water" (Hands Like Houses song), 2020 song by Hands Like Houses
 The Water (2009 film), a short film directed by Kevin Drew
 The Water (2022 film), an upcoming drama film directed by Elena López Riera

See also
 Water (disambiguation)